The Via Carini massacre was a Cosa Nostra attack in which, on 3 September 1982, in the Palermo's via Isidoro Carini, the prefect of Palermo Carlo Alberto Dalla Chiesa, his wife Emanuela Setti Carraro and the escort police officer Domenico Russo were murdered.

The dynamics of the massacre
General Dalla Chiesa was leaving the prefecture in a beige A112, led by his wife Emanuela Setti Carraro to go to dinner at a restaurant in Mondello. The A112 was followed by an Alfetta guided by the escort agent Domenico Russo. At 21:15, as they passed via Isidoro Carini, a motorcycle, led by a killer who had the mafioso Pino Greco (aka Scarpuzzedda) sitting behind him, flanked the Alfetta, where Greco killed him with an AK-47 rifle.

At the same time a car, led by Antonino Madonia and Calogero Ganci, reached the A112 and the killers violently opened fire against the car. Dalla Chiesa and his wife were hit by thirty bullets and the car slammed into the trunk of a parked Fiat Ritmo (the general tried to protect the woman with his own body). Greco got off the motorcycle and, turning around the A112 checked the mortal outcome of the incident and shot the victims in the head with a pistol. Immediately after, the car and the motorcycle used in the crime were brought to an isolated place and were burned.

Dalla Chiesa's spouse died instantly, while agent Domenico Russo died twelve days later, on 15 September.

Motivations 
The general had led as head of the special anti-terrorism centre of the Carabinieri, starting from September 1978, the counteroffensive of the state on extreme left-wing groups, in particular the Red Brigades with remarkable results. He had begun the process of disintegration of the terrorist phenomenon in Italy that would be definitively concluded after his death.

In virtue of his achievements, high prestige earned on the field, he was sent to Palermo as prefect of the city after the murder of the unionist and communist political man Pio La Torre. In the three years before his establishment, the Mafia had murdered among others skilled detectives, magistrates and political men such as Boris Giuliano, Cesare Terranova, Piersanti Mattarella and Gaetano Costa.

But Dalla Chiesa, in just over one hundred days as prefect in Palermo, did not have the promised and better defined "special powers" by the Government, complaining in August 1982 in a famous and controversial interview given to journalist of the newspaper La Repubblica Giorgio Bocca. In the former Province of Palermo was also the so-called Second Mafia War, in which the Corleonesi massacred their enemies to take control of the organization.

The massacre also surprised for the "military" mode with which it was executed: Dalla Chiesa and his wife were hit by a Kalashnikov AK 47, an assault rifle. Since the murder of Dalla Chiesa, the hypothesis, journalistic, historical and judicial (even if it was debated at the hearing both in the Giulio Andreotti trial for the external participation in mafia association in the murder of the journalist Carmine Pecorelli) that the death of the general and his wife is in some way also related to the memorial prepared by Aldo Moro during his seizure.

Investigations
The lead killer was Pino Greco, who was later convicted in absentia of the crime at the Maxi Trial when he was already dead without the judges knowing. A number of other gunmen were involved, including Giuseppe Lucchese, who was also sentenced to life imprisonment for the crime at the Maxi Trial. Bernardo Provenzano, Salvatore Riina, Giuseppe Calò, Bernardo Brusca, Francesco Madonia, Nenè Geraci and Francesco Spadaro were later also sentenced to life imprisonment in absentia for ordering the killing.

References

1982 in Italy
History of the Sicilian Mafia
September 1982 events in Europe
Massacres in Italy
Massacres in 1982
Organized crime events in Italy
1982 murders in Italy